Willy Diméglio (3 May 1934 – 27 March 2020) was a French politician.

Biography
Diméglio was defeated by Georges Frêche in the Montpellier municipal elections in 1989.

He was made a Knight of the Legion of Honour in 1998.

References

1934 births
2020 deaths
20th-century French politicians
21st-century French politicians
French general councillors
French city councillors
Members of the National Assembly (France)
Republican Party (France) politicians
Union for French Democracy politicians
People from Skikda
Chevaliers of the Légion d'honneur